Blackers Mill, was an intermediate-level football club playing in the Intermediate A division of the Mid-Ulster Football League in Northern Ireland. The club folded in 2013.

References

External links
 Daily Mirror Mid-Ulster Football League Official website
 nifootball.co.uk - (For fixtures, results and tables of all Northern Ireland amateur football leagues)
  - Official Facebook page

Association football clubs established in 1978
Association football clubs disestablished in 2013
Defunct association football clubs in Northern Ireland
1978 establishments in Northern Ireland
2013 disestablishments in Northern Ireland